This is a list of songs sung and written by musician Alanis Morissette.

Released songs

Other songs performed
"Mercy" (from The Prayer Cycle) – Alanis Morissette and Salif Keita
"Hope" (from The Prayer Cycle) – Alanis Morissette, Devin Provenzano, and The American Boychoir
"Innocence" (from The Prayer Cycle) – Alanis Morissette and Salif Keita
"Faith"(from The Prayer Cycle) – Alanis Morissette and Nusrat Fateh Ali Khan
"Arrival" (from What About Me? by 1 Giant Leap) – Alanis Morissette, Eugene Hütz, Al Tanbura & Aida Samb
"Wunderkind" (for The Chronicles of Narnia: The Lion, the Witch and the Wardrobe soundtrack)
"I Remain" (for Prince of Persia: The Sands of Time soundtrack) 
"Professional Torturer" (for 2010 Radio Free Albemuth film soundtrack)
"The Morning" (for A Small Section of the World 2014 documentary film)
"My Humps" (parody cover of My Humps by The Black Eyed Peas)
"Today" (for the political campaign of Marianne Williamson)

Unreleased songs
 "Pray for Peace"
 "Finally Acknowledgment" (So-Called Chaos Sessions)

References

 01
Morissette, Alanis
Morissette, Alanis
Morissette, Alanis